Horizon Middle School may refer to:

Horizon Middle School (Kissimmee, Florida)
Horizon Middle School (Horizon City, Texas)
Horizon Middle School (Spokane Valley, Washington), Central Valley School District